Anne Lockhart (born Anne Kathleen Maloney; September 6, 1953) is an American actress. She is best known for her role as Lieutenant Sheba in the television series Battlestar Galactica (1978–1979).

Early life
Lockhart  is the elder of two daughters of actress June Lockhart and the granddaughter of actors Gene and Kathleen Lockhart.

Lockhart attended Verde Valley School in Sedona, Arizona, appearing in her first school play as a senior there.

Career

Television
Lockhart began her career at the age of four, starring as Annie in the short film "T Is for Tumbleweed", which was nominated for an Academy Award in the category Best Live Action Short Film. She frequently accompanied her mother to the set of Lassie, where she made five uncredited appearances between 1959 and 1962. She began making credited guest appearances in 1965 starting with the Death Valley Days episode "Magic Locket". She has since made over 60 guest appearances in network television shows, including multiple appearances on series such as Knight Rider, Simon & Simon, The Fall Guy, Murder, She Wrote, and Diagnosis: Murder. In 1979, she appeared as Lieutenant Sheba in 11 episodes of Battlestar Galactica. She also appeared as Officer Kathy Mulligan in the CHiPs episode "The Return of the Super Cycle", and in the episode "A Dream of Jennifer" on Buck Rogers in the 25th Century.

In 1980, she appeared in a Magnum PI episode "Lest We Forget" playing a World War II flashback version of character Diane Westmore played by her mother June Lockhart. Through the 1980s and '90s, Lockhart appeared steadily in a variety of credited and uncredited roles primarily on television series. She appeared on Airwolf in episodes, "Random Target" in season two and "Day of Jeopardy" in season three, playing different characters.

In the 2000s and 2010s, Lockhart had several recurring and multiepisode minor roles on series such as The Lying Game, Dragnet, The West Wing, NCIS, the Law & Order franchise shows, and Chicago Fire. These roles were often "uncredited" and as a "policewoman". She also had similar one-time roles on shows such as Studio 60 on the Sunset Strip, Raines, and Chase. She also appeared in B. J. and the Bear in the episode "Fire in the Hole".

Film
Lockhart's first film role was playing Dora in the 1973 Western Jory. That same year, she appeared in the critically acclaimed Hallmark Hall of Fame episode Lisa, Bright and Dark, alongside Kay Lenz, Anne Baxter, and John Forsythe. She then appeared in the films Slashed Dreams (1975) and Joyride (1977), with Robert Carradine and Melanie Griffith. She played the young Eunice St. Clair in the 1986 horror film Troll, with her mother playing the older version of her character. Her other film credits include Just Tell Me You Love Me (1978), Hambone and Hillie (1983) opposite Lillian Gish, Young Warriors (1983), The Oasis (1984), The Serpent Warriors (1985), Dark Tower (1989), Big Bad John (1990), Bug Buster (1998), A Dog's Tale (1999), Daybreak (2000), Cahoots (2001), Hollywood, It's a Dog's Life (2004), ExTerminators (2009), and Dakota's Summer (2014).

Though Lockhart herself claims no recollection of being approached, she was reportedly John Carpenter's first choice to play the role of main character Laurie Strode in Halloween (1978). Other commitments kept her from doing so.

Other acting
In addition to her television and film appearances, Lockhart has also worked extensively in commercials and voice acting.  In 1997, she began working with Lane Davies to form the Kingsmen Shakespeare Festival, the forerunner of the Kingsmen Shakespeare Company, which offers seminars and summer camps aimed at teaching children ages 8–16 various acting techniques.
In recent years she has appeared onstage as Eleanor in “The Lion in Winter” (2010)and as Virginia in “It’s Only a Play”(2016)at River City Repertory Theatre.

Personal life
On December 24, 1986, Lockhart married Adam Carlyle Taylor, the son of Gunsmoke actor Buck Taylor and Judy Nugent. They had two children: a daughter, Carlyle, and a son, Zane. Taylor died in a motorcycle accident in Ennis, Montana on June 4, 1994.

A Catholic, Lockhart met Pope John Paul II in 1985 when she was invited to attend a papal audience in St. Peter's Square. She is also an expert horsewoman, having won championships in cutting, reining, team penning, and barrel racing.

Filmography

Film

Television

References

Citations

Sources

External links
 

 
 

1953 births
Living people
American child actresses
American film actresses
American stage actresses
American television actresses
American voice actresses
Actresses from New York City
American people of English descent
American people of Canadian descent
Catholics from New York (state)
20th-century American actresses
21st-century American actresses